Bernard Ochieng (born 25 January 1996) is a Kenyan professional footballer who plays as a defender for Vihiga United.

References

External links

1996 births
Living people
Kenyan footballers
Kenya international footballers
Association football defenders
2019 Africa Cup of Nations players